The Salmson-Moineau S.M.1 A3, (later re-designated Salmson Sal. 1 A3), was a French armed three-seat biplane long range reconnaissance aircraft of the First World War designed by René Moineau for the Salmson company.

Design and development
The S.M.1 A3 was developed from 1915 to meet the French military A3 specification, which called for a three-seat long range reconnaissance aircraft with strong defensive armament. The S.M.1 was unconventional, powered by a single Salmson 9A liquid-cooled radial engine mounted in the fuselage powering two airscrews mounted between the wings with a system of gears and drive shafts. This layout was chosen by Moineau to minimise drag. The twin airscrew layout allowed a wide field of fire for the two gunner-observers, one seated in the nose and one behind the pilot. Both gunners operated ring-mounted flexible 37 mm APX cannon built by Arsenal Puteaux. The airframe itself was relatively conventional, the boxy fuselage mounted on a system of struts between the wings. The undercarriage included a nose wheel, intended solely to prevent the aircraft nosing over, and a tail skid.

One aircraft may have been fitted experimentally with a Salmson (Canton-Unne) P.9 engine. A single S.M.2 S2 aircraft, with an additional Salmson 9A engine in the nose driving a conventional tractor airscrew, was tested with poor results, due to inadequate engine cooling, in 1918.

Operational history
The aircraft was tested in early 1916 and was sufficiently successful to receive an order for 100 aircraft although the performance was inferior to the Sopwith 1½ Strutter. In service the S.M.1 was not successful. The nose-wheel undercarriage would collapse if misused and this caused many accidents. The complicated transmission system was difficult to service in the field and the performance of the aircraft was poor. It appears that around 155 S.M.1s were built in total. The type was largely withdrawn from service in 1917 but a small number of aircraft remained in use until late 1918. Some S.M.1s were supplied to the Imperial Russian Air Service, but they were no better liked in Russia.

Operators

French Air Force

Imperial Russian Air Service

Variants
S.M.1 A3
The production 3-seat reconnaissance aircraft, powered by a single Salmson 9A2c radial engine laterally mounted in the fuselage driving two propellers via shafts and gearboxes.
S.M.2 S2
An enlarged S.M.1, for the S2 2-seater ground attack role, with extended upper wings with additional bracing, reinforced undercarriage and a second Salmson 9A2c in the nose driving a 2-bladed tractor propeller directly.

Specifications (S.M.1 A3)

Notes

References

 Davilla, James J., & Soltan, Arthur M., French Aircraft of the First World War. Stratford, Connecticut: Flying Machines Press, 1997. 

1910s French military reconnaissance aircraft
Military aircraft of World War I
Biplanes
Salmson aircraft
Single-engined tractor aircraft
Aircraft first flown in 1916